The National Collegiate Athletic Association (NCAA) is an athletics association of ten  private colleges and universities in Metro Manila, Philippines. Established in 1924, it is the oldest collegiate athletic association in the country. The Philippine NCAA is not affiliated with the NCAA of the United States.

Its current members are Arellano University, Colegio de San Juan de Letran, De La Salle–College of Saint Benilde, Emilio Aguinaldo College, José Rizal University, Lyceum of the Philippines University, Mapúa University, San Beda University, San Sebastian College – Recoletos, and the University of Perpetual Help System DALTA.

Organization
The Policy Board and the Management Committee handles the affairs of the league. The Board and the committee are composed of representatives of the ten member schools, and determine the acceptance and suspension of member schools, game reversals and replays, and other official actions.
During the nearly yearlong season from June to March, each school participates in 11 sports; each sport is conducted in two divisions: the Juniors for male high-school students, and the Seniors for college students. There are male and female Seniors divisions for some events. The Juniors and Seniors divisions each award a General Championship trophy at the end of the academic year to the school which had the best performance in all sports, based on the total number of points scored in a Championship tally.

The current president of the Policy Board is Dr. Jose Paulo Campos  the Emilio Aguinaldo College, while the Management Committee is headed by Estefania Boquiren, Jr. of Emilio Aguinaldo College

Membership changes
Rivalries developed in the hotly contested basketball event. These rivalries resulted in brawls among fans of member schools. Some brawls were full-blown that several schools decided to withdraw from the league. The NCAA authorities took measures to prevent brawls, such as the segregation of supporters of opposing schools in the playing venues. With the withdrawal of member schools came the admission of new members into the league. In season 2006–07, the league contemplated an expansion by establishing a Division II. After season 2008–09, PCU took an indefinite leave of absence after it was discovered that several high school players used spurious documents to enroll in the school. As a result, the league had only seven members in season 2009–10. Two schools (Arellano Chiefs and EAC Generals), were welcomed as probationary members in season 2010–11. In season 2011–12, the league welcomed the Lyceum Pirates as a guest team. In the 2013–14 season, Arellano was promoted to regular membership after four years in probation, while EAC and Lyceum remained in probationary membership. And in the 91st season of the league, the two probationary schools (EAC and LPU) was upgraded into regular members.

Member schools
The number and composition of NCAA members has changed over the years. The association is currently composed of the following colleges and universities, with their corresponding team names, affiliation, and year of admission.

Structure and hosting
 The Policy Board, composed of the presidents of member schools, manages the NCAA's external and internal affairs. It handles matters such as acceptance, replacement, and suspension of member schools. The NCAA presidency rotates among member schools.

The other main administrative body in the NCAA is the Management Committee (MANCOM), which determines matters of athletic concern, such as determining the proper conditions for playing, suspension of players, coaches, and referees, reversal or review of game results, and investigation of ineligible players. The Management Committee is composed of the athletics moderators (or athletic directors) of the member schools, who are selected by their respective university presidents, and the league chairperson, who is selected by the Policy Board. Like the league president, the chair of the Management Committee rotates among member schools.

The president of the Policy Board and the chairperson of the Management committee come from the school currently hosting the basketball tournament. The rotation is determined by the order of when each school joined the league. For the 2019–2020 season, the host will be Arellano University.

The host school manages the logistics, expenses, labor and security in the venues. Each sport has its own host, with the host for basketball being the head of all hosts.

Sports

The NCAA sponsors thirteen (juniors) and fourteen (seniors) sports, which are divided into two divisions: the Juniors division for high school students and the Seniors division for college students. There are male and female Seniors divisions for some events.

Each member college or university has an affiliated high school that competes in the Juniors division. For example, San Beda University's affiliated high school is its campus at Taytay, Rizal, while Colegio de San Juan de Letran's high school is found within its college campus at Intramuros. While these two high schools are integrated within their colleges, De La Salle-College of Saint Benilde is not directly connected with its high school affiliate, La Salle Green Hills (LSGH), except that they are both administered by the Lasallian Brothers. As a result, DLSU-CSB labels "St. Benilde" instead of "La Salle" on their jerseys.

The NCAA sponsors the following sports for Juniors and Seniors: basketball, soccer, poomsae,   swimming, taekwondo, track and field, chess, tennis (lawn and soft), table tennis, badminton, volleyball, and beach volleyball. The last three sporting events have a women's division.

In the 87th season of the NCAA, cheerleading has been upgraded to a "regular sport" which means it will contribute points in the overall championship race. In the 91st season of the league, poomsae was added as a "demonstration sport" being part of the taekwondo event.

The General Champion for the each division in an academic year is determined by a points system similar to the one used in Formula One, where the school with the highest accumulated score from all events in a division wins the General Championship. A championship in an event entitles a school with 40 points, the second placer 30, up to eighth place, with five points. For an example, see the tabulation of points for Season 84.

Currently, the De La Salle-College of Saint Benilde, San Beda University and Arellano University compete in all Seniors' sports, while La Salle Green Hills, San Beda College-Rizal and University of Perpetual Help System DALTA participates in all Juniors' sports.

History

Early years
The NCAA was founded in 1924 on the initiative of Dr. Regino R. Ylanan, a physical education professor of the University of the Philippines (UP). The original members were the Ateneo de Manila, De La Salle College, Institute of Accounts (now as Far Eastern University), National University (NU), San Beda College (SBC), the University of Manila, the University of the Philippines, and the University of Santo Tomas (UST).
The decision of the board of directors to file papers of incorporation with the then Bureau of Commerce in 1930 led to protests from the University of the Philippines, which was the only public institution among member schools, saying that it would lead to commercialization. National University and the University of Santo Tomas sided with the University of the Philippines on the matter. This led into the formation, via an Article of Agreement, of a triangular meet among NU, UP and UST, with the Board of Control's condition that NCAA events should take precedence. The league established came to be known as the "Big Three," and in 1932, the Article of Agreement was renewed.

In 1936, the University of the Philippines, National University (Philippines) and University of Santo Tomas withdrew permanently from the NCAA and continued with their own league, while Far Eastern University (FEU) withdrew on its own. Six schools remained in the league and became known as the "old-timer six" – Ateneo de Manila, Colegio de San Juan de Letran, De La Salle College, José Rizal College, Mapúa Institute of Technology and San Beda College. Also in 1936, league's basketball games were transferred to the newly completed Rizal Memorial Coliseum, owing to its accessibility among the schools, since most schools were in Manila.

In 1938, Far Eastern University, National University, the University of the Philippines and the University of Santo Tomas formed the University Athletic Association of the Philippines, a rival intercollegiate league.

The NCAA experienced a golden age during the postwar years. The Loyola Center at the Ateneo campus became the new home of the league. Due to the home court advantage of the Ateneo, Blue Eagles' games were held on the old Rizal Memorial.

1950s
The 1950s will be known in the annals of history as one of the best decades of the NCAA. The start of the decade was the glory year of the fabled Letran Murder Inc. Eventually, it will be the Ateneo de Manila Blue Eagles and San Beda Red Lions who would be locking horns during the fabled era.

The decade produced legendary collegiate players like Carlos Loyzaga (San Beda), Lauro "the Fox" Mumar (Letran), and Frankie Rabat (Ateneo) among others.

The 1950s was also known as the decade of the Crispulo Zamora Cup.  The Crispulo Zamora Cup was the trophy to be awarded by the NCAA for the first team to get three championship crowns.

The Letran Knights started with their 1950 campaign bannering their legendary Murder Inc. However, they lost steam when San Beda and Ateneo traded championships thereafter. San Beda won the crown in 1951 and the 1952 season. Ateneo stopped San Beda in 1953 and secured the 1954 championship. The 1955 season was the deciding year for the Crispulo Zamora Cup which San Beda eventually won.

In the post Zamora Cup era, La Salle made their own statement by winning the crown in 1956. Still, Ateneo was undaunted and secured the 1957 and 1958 trophy. A third straight post-Zamora crown was only foiled by San Beda in 1959 ending the legendary decade of the 1950s.

1960s to 1980s
NCAA basketball champions formed the core of the Filipino team sent to international competitions during 1960 and 1961 in Japan. The opening of the Araneta Coliseum, the largest indoor arena in the Philippines, prompted the league to transfer the championship round there.

By the 1960s, the league experienced problems such as eligibility of players and interscholastic hooliganism. This led to disagreements among member schools, and as a result the 1962–63 season was suspended, and the following two seasons were held in a loose conference format, where the home and away system was used. San Sebastian College - Recoletos joined the league in 1969. Trinity College of Quezon City also joined in 1974, the league's golden anniversary, according to newspapers and other publications of that year. (However, the NCAA's official website states that Trinity joined the league in 1985; see next section.)

After the riotous games of the late 1970s, several of the founding members left the league. The Ateneo de Manila University left the league in 1978 due to violence, which also marred a championship series with San Beda, while La Salle left after a riotous game with Letran in 1980. Ateneo de Manila was accepted in the UAAP in 1978, while La Salle had to wait for six years to become a UAAP member. San Beda left the league in 1983, reasoning that the college focused on school-based sports activities like intramurals.

With the withdrawal of Ateneo de Manila, league games returned to the old Rizal Memorial and to the PhilSports Arena, since the Loyola Center was now the location of the UAAP tournament. Also with the withdrawal of the three founding members, most daily publications tagged the NCAA as "an ironic journey from sports to violence."

1980s to 1990s expansion
As the league was reduced to four members, new membership was actively pursued. Perpetual Help College of Rizal was accepted as a member in 1984. A year later, Trinity College of Quezon City finally was accepted as a full member after being a probationary member for more than a decade, according to publications of that period). However, Trinity was not able to meet league requirements and was dropped from the league in 1986, the same year San Beda returned (despite sports articles in newspapers that year stating Trinity voluntarily left the league).

Measures were taken to prevent major brawls from starting such as the patrolling by the respective faculties of the member schools, to control the behavior of the crowd were implemented as part of the remedy to ensure the security during the NCAA games.

The addition of Philippine Christian University and De La Salle-College of Saint Benilde in the late 1990s brought the league membership to eight schools .

Television coverage of NCAA basketball games was discontinued in the 1980s and 1990s by the TV networks due to the bad image of the League and frequent brawls during games. After several years of non television coverage of NCAA basketball games, television coverage was resumed by Vintage Television in 1998. The majority of the basketball games were aired live on IBC 13 until 1999. In 2000, the league switched the TV coverage from Vintage to the MCI group and games aired on People's Television Network but which aired only a single game of each playing day until the NCAA games were produced by Silverstar Sports in 2001.

A major breakthrough occurred when the league, upon the initiative of host school San Beda, made a move that switched the television coverage of NCAA games from MCI group to ABS-CBN on March 18, 2002. Previously, only the Final Four and the Championship games were televised, but with the five-year contract inked with ABS-CBN, a majority of the elimination round basketball games were also aired, giving the league bigger exposure to fans, students and alumni.  ABS-CBN would later air the games on its international affiliate, The Filipino Channel, making the games viewable to alumni and fans abroad.

Current expansion
The NCAA has set its plan of expansion. Division II, as it will be called, will be composed of newly admitted schools. The league has already visited and issued invitations to schools such as Arellano University, Emilio Aguinaldo College and the Lyceum of the Philippines University.

In 1998, the affiliated schools in the Calabarzon region and southern Metro Manila established  NCAA South, an offshoot of the league. The schools of NCAA South do not compete with the schools in the main league.

The return of a Mapúa Juniors team, which took a leave of absence beginning NCAA Season 81 (2005–06) was scheduled in NCAA Season 83 (2007–08). Malayan High School will represent the Mapúa Institute of Technology in the Juniors Division of the NCAA. This newly established  High School would only be fully operational by school year 2007–08. However, the scheduled return of the Mapua Junior varsity team in NCAA Season 83 (2007–08), did not materialize and instead it resumed participation in NCAA Season 84 (2008–09).

After it was revealed that several players of the PCU juniors' basketball team enrolled with spurious documents, PCU's seniors and juniors teams were suspended in the 2007–08 season. The seniors teams participated in the 2008–09 season, but all teams would take an indefinite leave of absence starting with the 2009–10 season. As a result, the Management Committee conducted a search for PCU's replacement but it was decided that such replacements would be deferred to the 2010–11 season. The league opted to invite guest teams instead, with Angeles University Foundation, Arellano University (AU) and Emilio Aguinaldo College (EAC) being the invitees, and being eligible to win championships. On the next season, AU and EAC's status was upgraded to probationary membership. Lyceum of the Philippines University, which had earlier sought membership, was accepted as a guest team in the 2011–12 season. Arellano became a regular member since the 2013–14 season after meeting the league requirements. EAC and Lyceum were accepted by the league as regular members starting 2015–16 season.

Due to the loss of the congressional franchise of ABS-CBN, GMA Network and GMA News TV (later GTV since February 22, 2021) will air the future seasons of the NCAA for 5 years, from Seasons 96 to 101.

Membership timeline

Early rivalries
Almost all of the rivalries of the NCAA originated from the basketball court, since basketball is the sport most covered by the media, especially on television. Most of the rivalries started due to the schools' compositions, because four of the old-timer six were schools exclusively for males from affluent families. These rivalries have declined in recent years with the withdrawal of two of the old-timer six, Ateneo and La Salle.

With the addition of new members to the league, rivalries shifted to more of a geographical nature. However, the former members would still face their old rivals in other leagues during the off-season, such as the Home and Away Invitational League, the Philippine Collegiate Championship, and the Shakey's V-League.

Ateneo–UP

A rivalry between the Ateneo de Manila and the University of the Philippines existed even before the formation of the NCAA. UP students would troop from Padre Faura to the Ateneo campus in Intramuros to play basketball with the Ateneans, which led to  Ateneo forming the first organized cheering squad and pep band in the Philippines and what is now known as the Blue Babble Battalion.
This would later become "UAAP's Battle of Katipunan" when both universities transferred to their respective campuses along Katipunan Avenue in Quezon City, and when the two schools began competing in the UAAP.

Ateneo–La Salle

Arguably the most popular rivalry in Filipino sports was forged in the NCAA: the Ateneo–La Salle rivalry. Historical records are unclear on when the rivalry began, although there are arguments pointing to La Salle's 1939 defeat of a top-seeded Ateneo basketball team and their being dethroned by the Ateneans who beat the Lasallites in the elimination round. While La Salle held their victory parade, they threw fried chickens at the Padre Faura gate of the Ateneo. However. the La Salle cage team was disbarred for fielding an ineligible player the following year (although the title would not become Ateneo's until 1941, two years after the defeat).

Ateneo–La Salle games were always heated, for both schools were exclusively for males. However, La Salle during its stint in the NCAA was not as strong a contender as Ateneo was (see Ateneo–San Beda rivalry), with Ateneo not meeting La Salle again until the 1958 Finals, where Ateneo prevailed. Ateneo–La Salle games are now some of the most anticipated games of the UAAP season.

Ateneo–San Beda

With the departure of University of the Philippines, the Ateneo de Manila and San Beda College fielded the dominant basketball teams for several seasons, having won the last six titles between them. It was in this context that the fierce rivalry between the Ateneo and San Beda emerged.  The two teams traded championships in the 1930s that was halted when La Salle scored an upset over Ateneo in the 1939 season.  By the time World War II began, Ateneo already had the most number of NCAA senior's basketball titles with six, whereas San Beda had five titles to its name.

The ensuing years saw the two schools trade championships and end one another's winning streaks. The rivalry between the Blue Eagles and Red Lions continued and there were  memorable games in the 1950s that ensued between the two teams. Carlos Loyzaga's San Beda Red Lions toppled the Ateneo Blue Eagles from 1951 to 1952.  Then, the Blue Eagles under the leadership of Frankie Rabat captured the 1953 and 1954 NCAA titles. 1955 was the year when the Crispulo Zamora trophy was awarded to San Beda when they defeated Ateneo for the coveted crown. The Blue Eagles again prevailed with 1957 and 1958 back-to-back crown only to be defeated by San Beda in 1959.

The rivalry continued in the 1970s, when their sons, Chito Loyzaga and Louie Rabat met in the NCAA. The rivalry came to an end in the 1977 Finals series. In Game One, a brawl ensued among fans of the competing teams, which led to the third game being played behind closed doors, with San Beda winning the basketball championship, after Ateneo's last second shot was ruled invalid. The violence surrounding this championship series, coupled with the violence that was plaguing the league, led to the withdrawal from the NCAA of both Ateneo and San Beda. The Blue Eagles left with 14 seniors titles, a record for the most number of seniors titles that would only be tied and surpassed decades later. San Beda later won its 14th title in 2008. The Ateneo de Manila joined the UAAP, while San Beda College eventually came back to the NCAA.

La Salle–Letran

In the 1970s, La Salle started its own rivalry against Letran. Letran then had 6 championships while La Salle got its fifth championship at the expense of Letran in the diamond (75th year) championship series. De La Salle College then was managed by Ambassador Eduardo Cojuangco, a known crony of then President Ferdinand Marcos. Coincidentally, Cojuangco controlled the FIBA-recognized Basketball Association of the Philippines (BAP) and was appointed by Marcos as project-director for basketball.

The rivalry came into a climax on an August 16, 1980, La Salle–Letran game. The Letran bleachers were totally unoccupied minutes before the game began; Letran school authorities would not let their students get inside unless De La Salle's team manager's "guests" leave the south end bleachers that are part of the Letran stands.

The group moved over to the north end (La Salle side) after talks between Ambassador Cojuangco and Letran Rector Fr. Regino Cortes. Only then did the Letran bleachers fill up. With the game on the way, Letran was toting a 22–18 lead when they called a time-out halfway through the first half; then, the south end reserve section (Letran side) erupted with at least five burly men (part of the guests of La Salle's team manager) ganging up on a hapless Letran high school sophomore student for a full minute before police could intervene. But for the mauled student, none was picked up (by the police). Almost simultaneously, the La Salle bench suddenly stood up, the players hunched and protecting their heads with towels and jackets against various missiles pelted on them.

The "guests" of De La Salle's team manager were also present during that time when La Salle was able to win over Letran on August 6. Should La Salle win on August 16, it still has to face San Beda (the other qualifier) and win to clinch the round championship; a victory by Letran over La Salle gives it the first round flag.

Cojuangco never explained why his "guests" just happened to be positioned in the Letran side of the Coliseum. La Salle for its part, claims that the five men who beat up the Letran student were La Salle students, and both teams went immediately to their respective dugouts. A large number of spectators were hurt, and a great portion of the coliseum was damaged. The game was called off by the NCAA and ordered a replay behind closed doors, but the BAP ordered the remainder of the season to be canceled. La Salle then announced on a press conference in September 1981 that they will withdraw from the NCAA effective at the end of the 1980–81 season.

The BAP had its findings released that the rumble was started by Letran students thus giving Letran a one-year layoff in the NCAA. Letran was immediately reinstated back in 1981.

The rivalry was revived, after the La Salle's sister school  College of Saint Benilde and Letran met in the finals in both seniors and juniors of the 98th season.

Recent rivalries
After the former members transferred to the UAAP, new rivalries were formed and the NCAA slowly revived its former glory.

Letran–San Sebastian

After both Ateneo and La Salle left, San Sebastian (frequently shortened to "Baste") strengthened their basketball program. The recruitment of Paul Alvarez by San Sebastian and Samboy Lim by Letran provided several close games in the 1980s which led to the birth of the rivalry.

In the 1980s, Letranites were notorious for yelling profanities at the San Sebastian players, and on one occasion, led to a rumble at Vito Cruz Avenue when at the last second, a power interruption occurred, causing confusion on what team won the championship. The rumbles between the two schools have become more frequent which solidified the intense rivalry between the two schools. Paul Alvarez would later play for the Pennsylvania Valley Dawgs of the United States Basketball League.

The rivalry continued in the turn of the millennium when the Stags met the Knights in the finals twice. This led to several memorable games in which the Knights won the 1998 edition with a barrage of three-pointers and free way ows by Letran's Nicholas Pacheco with a few seconds remaining to win their 13th championship. The Knights also became the first 4th seed to upset the 1st seed in the Final Four when they defeated the Stags twice during the 1999 NCAA Final Four. That feat would soon be duplicated the following year when the 4th seed Stags upended top seed JRC Heavy Bombers in the 2000 NCAA Final Four. The Knights went on to win the 1999 NCAA championship. In the 2003 NCAA Finals, the Stags (defending champs) made a rally in the 4th quarter in the 3rd game of their series and kept Letran scoreless for almost 6 minutes that led them to take the lead but Boyet Bautista started the comeback by tying the game at 48-all and then his teammates Jonathan Piñera and Aaron Aban finished the game to win their 15th championship at the expense of the Stags. In 2004, they renewed their rivalry in the second round of eliminations wherein Letran denied Baste's Final 4 hopes and eventually broke their streak of Final Four appearances (since the inception of the final four format in 1998 San Sebastian is always in the Final Four) making it their worst performance in 6 years.

In 2009, Letran ended San Sebastian's 15 winning streak as they gave out the Stags' first loss of the season, and the Knights prevented the Golden Stags from sweeping the 18 game elimination round to qualify outright in the Finals

In 2010, Letran gave San Sebastian a scare as the Stags escaped the Knights with a one-point lead.and The Stags put the  Knights in the brink of elimination

In 2011, Letran once again ended the Stags' 15-game winning streak and gave its first loss of the season via overtime.

In 2012, Letran swept the series against San Sebastian at the elimination round. With the Stags had a twice-to-beat advantage over the Knights, Letran once again beat San Sebastian to force another game as Kevin Alas scored 43 points, in the do-or-die game, Letran came back in the fourth quarter to beat the Stags, 73–70, eliminating the Stags from the Finals contention versus San Beda.

In 2017, Both schools met in the playoffs for the first time since 2013 but this time in a hard way with Lyceum sweeping the regular season 18-0 and automatically advances to the finals. 3 teams tied for the number 4 seed in the stepladder semifinals with San Sebastian had the highest quotient among the 3 against Letran and Arellano with the latter 2 needed to figure it out in a knock out match (in which Letran won) in the right to face against San Sebastian. In the proper 4th-seed playoff game, San Sebastian's Michael Calisaan scored a season-high and a career-high double double performance of 36 points and 10 rebounds to eliminate Letran anew with a score of 74-69(with the Golden Stags scoring the last 5 points including a 3-point shot going into regulation that put away the game from the Knights) to advanced to the 1st round of the stepladder semifinals facing off against the JRU Heavy Bombers.

In 2019, With San Beda sweeping the regular season 18–0, gaining an outright finals berth and forcing the post season into a stepladder format. Both teams faced off in the 1st round of the stepladder semifinals with Letran winning the game 85-80(as the Knights survived a late 4th quarter scare from San Sebastian after the Stags cut the deficit into a 1-point game heading into regulation) to advanced to the 2nd round against the Lyceum Pirates (in which Letran also won 92–88) enrouting to their Cinderella run against the San Beda Red Lions, and winning the championship.

Letran–Mapúa 

The "Battle of Intramuros," which is so named because the two schools are three blocks apart from each other in Intramuros, is the name given to the Letran-Mapúa games. The Cardinals have had the mastery of the Knights in recent years. For eight consecutive years from 1998, Letran has failed to beat Mapúa in the eliminations rounds at least twice (either they will split the eliminations or Mapúa will win twice), even though the Knights were more successful in the league.

The Knights were finally able to beat Mapúa in the first round of the 2005 tournament, but the Cardinals avenged that loss in the second round when they dealt the Knights with their first and only defeat of the season. Letran Knights were on their way on scoring a rare a 14–0 sweep of the elimination round when they were stopped by the Mapúa Cardinals in their twelfth game of the eliminations Letran and Mapúa would split their games in subsequent seasons. In 2009 Letran finally end its 2nd-round losing streak against Mapúa and its first sweep against their Intramuros rivals in league history

Although the only instance where Letran and Mapúa met in the Finals was in the 1979 season where the Knights prevailed, the championship won by the Cardinals in 1981 (the games were suspended in the 1980 season due to the La Salle–Letran fracas) proved to be a spoiler once again as it denied Letran the bragging rights to the unprecedented honor of being the first ever NCAA team to win five consecutive seniors championships (Letran also won the 1982, 1983, and 1984 crowns), a feat that would later on be achieved by the San Sebastian Stags from 1993 to 1997.

Saint Benilde – San Sebastian

This short lived rivalry sparked when the De La Salle - College of Saint Benilde, who joined only in 1998, met San Sebastian College - Recoletos (or simply Baste) in the finals of 2000, and 2002. CSB won in the Finals of 2000, bannered by what is dubbed as the best CSB Blazers team ever assembled. With 1999 NCAA Rookie of the Year and 2002 NCAA MVP Sunday Salvacion, Jondan Salvador, and 2000 NCAA Rookie of the Year Alejandro Magpayo leading the charge, the St. Benilde Blazers beat the formidable San Sebastian Stags and won their first NCAA seniors basketball championship title, despite joining the league a season earlier. This marks the fastest win for any new school in the league since the World War.

However, the Stags avenged their defeat and triumphed over CSB in the Finals of 2002, where they swept  Blazers, 2–0. The Stags' Leomar Najorda was adjudged the 2002 NCAA Finals MVP.

José Rizal – San Sebastian

The rivalry started in 1972 when José Rizal was playing in the championship against new member San Sebastian. The Heavy Bombers was bannered by Philip Cezar, David Cezar, Ed Carvajal, Jess Sta. Maria, Cris Calilan, Olimpio Santos, Jimmy Santos and Norberto Rivera. San Sebastian has their own superstar with the like of Dave Supnet. JRU (JRC then) captured the NCAA crown which up to this date is the last time José Rizal won a championship.  Years later the two teams again figured in a mini rivalry, San Sebastian's Paul Alvarez and José Rizal's Vergel Meneses figured in a PABL Slam Dunk contest in 1987 in which Meneses won the contest. As contrasted with SSC-R's five consecutive championships in the 1990s, JRC continued to struggle and not until 1999 where the Heavy Bombers made it to the finals but lost to the defending champion Letran Knights.

In 2000, the Golden Stags and the Heavy Bombers met in the Final Four. JRC clinched the  1 seed while SSC-R got the 4th seed. The Stags defeated the Bombers twice to advance to the Finals against CSB. Thus, the Stags became the second (Letran did the trick in 1999 also against the Stags) 4th seed to upset the 1st seed in the Final Four. SSC-R and JRU also met in the 2001 Finals. JRU was bannered by Ariel Capus,  season MVP Ernani Epondulan, Rodel Milla, Joel Finuliar and razzle dazzle pointguard Erwin Estebal while San Sebastian was led by Mark Macapagal, Christian Coronel and Jam Alfad. JRU lost in the series, which included a 33-point blowout loss in the deciding Game 3. Coronel was named as the 2001 NCAA Finals MVP.

The rivalry continued during Final Four appearances of both schools from 2002 and 2003. Not until the 2007 NCAA season when San Sebastian's Final Four chances was denied by José Rizal via a 7-point winning margin in a come from behind victory.  The Stags was ahead by 7 points against the Heavy Bombers 1:10 to go in regulation.  José Rizal capitalized on the errors of San Sebastian and force an overtime to win the game.  This allowed JRU to grab the number 3 spot in the Final Four. JRU had another part in eliminating SSC-R in the 2008 season when they were tied for the number 2 seed with two other teams; in the ensuing classification playoffs JRU and San Sebastian met in the first round to decide which team will figure in a playoff for the No. 2 seed; the Heavy Bombers won the game and relegated San Sebastian to the fourth-seed playoffs where they were eliminated. In 2009 San Sebastian and JRU renewed their rivalry once again in the Final Four wherein a Jimbo Aquino-less-Golden Stags (whose serving a one game-suspension after committing a flagrant foul against San Beda for the 1st-seed playoff which also barred him from getting any individual awards) were beaten by the Heavy Bombers 72–65 in Game 1, But in Game 2 of their semifinals series with Jimbo Aquino returning from his suspension The Stags defeated The Heavy Bombers 79–64 and the Stags entered the Finals for the first time since 2003 wherein the Stags loses against the Letran Knights in 3 games. Eventually the Stags won the championship against the four-peat seeking Red Lions wherein the Stags had its vengeance on the Red Lions via sweep The Stags' Jimbo Aquino was named the 2009 NCAA Finals MVP and ending San Beda's dynasty San Sebastian won its last title since 2002 when they swept the St. Benilde Blazers. In 2010 San Sebastian and JRU once again met in the playoffs for the third consecutive year and second in the semifinals with San Beda's sweep of the elimination round which led to a stepladder format in the semifinals JRU and Mapúa figure it out in the first round in which JRU won 60–54 The Heavy Bombers advance to the next round against the defending champions San Sebastian Stags. But in that Part III of San Sebastian-JRU. San Sebastian won the game 61–52, completing a season series sweep against the Heavy Bombers (also in 2002 and 2003) and making it a second consecutive finals appearance for the Golden Stags and faces last years' Finals tormentor and losing finalist San Beda Red Lions. In 2017 both San Sebastian & JRU met in the semifinals for the first time since 2010 with the top-seeded Lyceum swept the regular season. the 3rd-seeded Heavy Bombers (who swept the Golden Stags in the regular season that will give them an advantage) faces the 4th-seeded Golden Stags (who survive a scare from a stubborn Letran team that pave the way for them to enter the semifinals) but in that San Sebastian-JRU game was different as the Golden Stags emerged victorious after San Sebastian blew the game wide open as they led by 26 points heading in the 4th quarter despite JRU putting San Sebastian into the penalty situation early in the 4th quarter and managing to cut the deficit by at least 15 points but the resilient Golden Stags still won the game over the Heavy Bombers 85–73, to advanced to another knockout match against defending champions San Beda Red Lions.

Letran - San Beda

The rivalry started on October 28, 1950, when Letran and San Beda meet in the finals for the first time. Letran then was led by Lauro Mumar while San Beda was led by Carlos Loyzaga. Letran is on the verge of sweeping the tournament to become eventual champions (the Final 4 format was not yet implemented), but San Beda spoiled it and beat them to arrange a championship showdown with the Knights. In the finals, Letran got their sweet revenge as they beat San Beda to get their second title in the NCAA. The Letran team was called "Murder Inc." by the late Willie Hernandez because of their merciless brand of basketball, very unforgiving. After that historic match, San Beda kept on winning many championships until the 1970s while Letran ended the 1970s with only six championships. During the 1980s the NCAA has seen the downfall of the San Beda basketball program while Letran peaked and became a powerhouse team that will continue until the millennium decade.

With the exit of their fierce rivals, Ateneo for San Beda and La Salle for Letran, some say the rivalry has died down because of their heaven and earth situation not until in 2006 when the Lions won their 12th championship after 28 years. During that same year San Beda won twice against Letran and denied the Knights to gain a twice-to-beat advantage in the Final Four.

In 2007, San Beda and Letran played for the championship for the second time and was dubbed "The Dream Finals" because it featured two NCAA teams who have very rich basketball history and tradition and in this series, San Beda has a championship score to settle with Letran (to avenge their defeat in the finals 57 years ago). The Red Lions eventually swept the Knights, 2–0. San Beda's Rogemar Menor was named as the 2007 NCAA Finals MVP. Right now they are the most anticipated games in the NCAA which led to bringing the games at the Araneta Coliseum. They are also compared to UAAP's Ateneo–La Salle where in some columnists say it is the "icing in the cake" of today's NCAA.

San Beda – Perpetual

Also called the "New Age Rivalry", Perpetual has established itself as a perennial contender for the modern times, their path to the title has always been blocked by San Beda.

The University of Perpetual Help has made the Final Four in four out of the previous five seasons only to be ousted by eventual champion San Beda College every single time.

Arellano–Perpetual

This rivalry is totally different and interesting. It is started on Season 86. Arellano and Perpetual are tight and wild contenders in many sports, such as Basketball, Track and Field, and especially in Beach Volleyball, volleyball, and cheerleading. Through the following years, the 2 schools are the team to beat in volleyball and cheerleading. In these particular sports, these two schools are always in the Final 2, they are always compete with each other and vie for the win. Even if this rivalry is tough, the 2 schools had a great relationship at each other. Key players for this rivalry are Arellano's Jiovanni Jalalon, Zach Nicholls, John Pinto, and Keith Agovida, in basketball; Christine Joy Rosario, Menchie Tubiera, Rialen Sante, and Danna Henson in volleyball. While on Perpetual are: Scottie Thompson, Bright Akhuetie, Gerald Dizon, in basketball; Royse Tubino, Coleen Bravo, and Lourdes Clemente in volleyball.

NCAA championships

General Championship
Badminton (Demonstration)
Basketball - list of champions
Beach volleyball
Cheerleading
Chess
Football
Lawn tennis
Soft Tennis (Demonstration)
Softball (Discontinued)
Swimming
Table tennis
Taekwondo
Track and field
Volleyball

See also
International University Sports Federation
List of NCAA Philippines seasons
National Collegiate Athletic Association (Philippines) South
Men's National Collegiate Athletic Association
Women's National Collegiate Athletic Association
University Athletic Association of the Philippines
Premier Volleyball League

Notes

References

Other references
The GUIDON, Ateneo de Manila University
Aegis, Ateneo de Manila University
The Perpetualite, University of Perpetual Help System DALTA
NCAA souvenir program

External links
GMA's coverage website for the NCAA

 
1924 establishments in the Philippines
Student sport in the Philippines
Sports organizations established in 1924